"Want!" (stylized as "WANT!") is the 30th single by the Japanese idol group Berryz Kobo,  released in Japan on December 19, 2012.

Background 
The single was released in four versions: Limited Edition A (catalog number PKCP-5216/7), Limited Edition B (PKCP-5218/9), Limited Edition C (PKCP-5220), and Regular Edition (PKCP-5221). Each edition has a different cover. All the limited editions were shipped sealed and included a serial-numbered entry card for the lottery to win a ticket to one of the single's launch events. The limited editions A and B included a bonus DVD: Limited Edition A DVD contained the "Want! (Dance Shot Ver.)" music video, Limited Edition B — "Want! (Dance Shot Ver. II)".

The corresponding DVD single (so called Single V) was released a week later, on December 26.  As of November 27, the music video for the title song had been uploaded to the Berryz Kobo official YouTube channel.

Track listing

Bonus 
Sealed into all the limited editions
 Event ticket lottery card with a serial number

Charts

References

External links 
 CD single, profile on the Hello! Project official website
 CD single, profile on the Up-Front Works official website
 Single V, profile on the Hello! Project official website
 Single V, profile on the Up-Front Works official website

2012 singles
Japanese-language songs
Berryz Kobo songs
Songs written by Tsunku
Song recordings produced by Tsunku
2012 songs
Piccolo Town singles
Japanese synth-pop songs